An Internet appliance is a consumer device whose main function is easy access to Internet services such as WWW or e-mail. The term was popularized in the 1990s, when it somewhat overlapped in meaning with an information appliance, Internet computer, network computer, or even thin client, but now it has fallen out of general use.

Internet appliance was contrasted with any general purpose computer. The basic design idea behind Internet appliance is that it can be made cheaper and much more usable by narrowing its functionality and limiting available configuration options. Modern smart phones and tablet computers do approximately the same things, but are more powerful, more successful in the market, and generally not classified as Internet appliances.

History 
The first appliances to be marketed successfully gave constant information on the weather or on the state of the stock market, by means of changes in colors or by using analog gauges. Internet appliances were promoted by a variety of technology companies during the 1990s but, as the price of full-featured computers dropped, never met the market expectations. Jim Louderback would later describe the concept as one of the "eight biggest tech flops ever".

An Internet tablet is a type of a mobile Internet appliance. Examples include the Sony Airboard and the Nokia Internet Tablet series (including the Nokia N900).

Early in the 21st century a new breed of household devices, such as Vonage Internet Phones, PenguinRadio's Internet radio, and IPTV boxes, began to use the broadband connections in PC-independent ways.

Notable devices

Current
 aigo MID
 Apple iPad
 Chromebook
 Litl Webbook
 MailBug
 Personal Internet Communicator

Discontinued
 3Com Audrey
 Amstrad E-mailer
 CIDCo Mivo/MailStation
 Compaq iPAQ
 ePod
 i-Opener
 MSN Companion
 MSN TV
 New Internet Computer
 Nokia 770 Internet Tablet
 Nokia N800
 Nokia N810
 Nokia N900
 Pepper Pad
 Sony Airboard
 Sony eVilla
 Sony Mylo
 Virgin Webplayer
 VTech Companion

See also 

 Computer appliance
 Ubiquitous computing
 Mobile Internet Device (MID)
 Server appliance
 Netbook

References

External links

 Linux-Hacker.net Community Page pertaining to getting Linux to run on older Internet Appliances

Classes of computers
Information appliances